The Pinky Pruitt Barn is a historic barn on the south side of Arkansas Highway 14, just west of St. James, Arkansas.  It is a single-crib structure  stories in height, built out of rough-hewn logs, with a stone pier foundation.  It is surrounded on three sides by open sheds supported by log posts.  It was built about 1890, and is reflective of the earliest form of barn built in Stone County by arriving settlers.

The barn was listed on the National Register of Historic Places in 1985.

See also
National Register of Historic Places listings in Stone County, Arkansas

References

Barns on the National Register of Historic Places in Arkansas
Buildings and structures completed in 1890
Buildings and structures in Stone County, Arkansas
National Register of Historic Places in Stone County, Arkansas